Zach Wood (born January 10, 1993) is an American football long snapper for the New Orleans Saints of the National Football League (NFL). He played college football at SMU. He has also been a member of the Dallas Cowboys.

Early years
Wood attended Rowlett High School in Rowlett, Texas, where he played defensive tackle. As a junior, he recorded 99 tackles, 32 tackles for loss and 8 sacks. He posted 115 tackles and 10 sacks his senior season, earning honorable-mention Class 4A All-State as a defensive lineman.

College career
Wood accepted a football scholarship from Southern Methodist University. He was redshirted in 2011. He played in nine games in 2012, tallying five solo tackles, four tackle assists and half a sack.

He played in 12 games, all starts as a 3-4 defensive end, in 2013, making 25 solo tackles, 24 tackle assists, one sack, one pass breakup, two forced fumbles, one fumble recovery and one blocked kick.

Wood appeared in 12 games, all starts as a 3-4 defensive end, in 2014, registering 18 solo tackles, 22 tackle assists, 4 sacks and 1 fumble recovery.

He played in 10 games with 9 starts in 2015 and was a team captain. He recorded 29 solo tackles, 10 tackle assists, 3.5 sacks, 2 pass breakups and 3 blocked kicks. Wood also spent time at long snapper in college. He finished his college career with 33-of-43 starts, 137 tackles, 22 tackles for loss, 9 sacks, 2 forced fumbles and 3 blocked kicks.

Professional career
Wood was rated the 85th best defensive end in the 2016 NFL Draft by NFLDraftScout.com.

Dallas Cowboys
Wood was signed as an undrafted free agent by the Dallas Cowboys after the 2016 NFL Draft, following a rookie minicamp tryout on May 24. During his first training camp with the team, he also played on the defensive line, even taking the snaps with the first defense in practices. He was waived on September 1, 2016.

He signed a reserve/future contract with the Cowboys on January 16, 2017. In his second training camp with the Cowboys, he concentrated on being a long snapper and taking some of the practice load from stalwart L. P. Ladouceur. He was released on September 2, 2017.

New Orleans Saints
In 2017, the New Orleans Saints couldn't find a potential candidate for the long snapper job during training camp. On August 28, the Saints obtained Jon Dorenbos from the Philadelphia Eagles in exchange for a seventh-round draft pick (not exercised). On September 7, it was revealed that Dorenbos was diagnosed with an aortic aneurysm, which required immediate heart surgery. He was placed on the non-football illness list the same day, and released with an injury settlement on September 9, before announcing his retirement. On September 9, Wood was signed by the New Orleans Saints, after a last minute tryout that included four other players. He successfully became the team's long snapper for all punts and placekicks during the season.

On February 20, 2018, he was re-signed to a one-year contract. On February 11, 2019, he was re-signed to a one-year contract. On March 23, 2020, Wood signed a four-year contract with the Saints. He was placed on the reserve/COVID-19 list by the team on August 6, 2020, and activated from the list three days later.

References

External links
New Orleans Saints bio
SMU Mustangs bio

1993 births
Living people
American football defensive ends
American football long snappers
Dallas Cowboys players
New Orleans Saints players
People from Rowlett, Texas
Players of American football from Texas
SMU Mustangs football players
Sportspeople from the Dallas–Fort Worth metroplex